Sarah Beeny's New Life in the Country is a British television series, first shown in 2020, which showed property developer Sarah Beeny and her family's move to Somerset from London, including building their dream home and adapting to country life.

A second series began in November 2021, showing the fitting out and decoration of the interior of their new home, and improvements such as hedge restoration and tree planting to the surrounding land.

Premise
Sarah Beeny and her husband, artist Graham Swift decided to sell up their London home as well as their stately home wedding business, Rise Hall and move to a former 220 acre farm near Bruton. The farm had permission to build a new house, but Beeny and Swift wanted to build a mini stately home in a different field that planning permission had been granted for.

Controversy

The first series had several controversies, such as Beeny keeping a wild rabbit that their cat had caught as a pet. There was also public uproar that the programme was out of touch during the COVID-19 pandemic. The property was given planning permission even though there was local opposition to the development.

Episodes

Series 1 (2020)

Series 2 (2021-2022)

References

2020 British television series debuts
2020s British documentary television series
Channel 4 original programming
English-language television shows